PNS/M Ghazi (S-134), formerly known as NRP Cachalote (S165), was a diesel-electric submarine that served in the Pakistan Navy from 1975 until decommissioned in 2006. In the service with Pakistan Navy, she was the only ship of her Albacora class in the Submarine Command.

Originally named NRP Cachalote (S165), she was procured and transferred quickly to the Pakistan Navy by the Portuguese Navy after learning the news of Portuguese selling the submarine to private sector in December 1975.

In 1991–95, she participated in the naval operations during the Somali Civil War.

In 1997-98, she was the film site of the Ghazi Shaheed, a telefilm released in 1998.

On 2 January 2006, she was decommissioned from her military service, completing 34-years of service with the Pakistan Navy.

See also

References

External links
 Submarine Command (COMSUBS)

1968 ships
Ships built in Portugal
Albacora-class submarines
Pakistan–Portugal relations
Hangor-class submarines (Daphné-class)
1998 in Pakistani television